Robert Bettauer (born May 2, 1956) is a Canadian tennis broadcaster and former professional player. He is also a former national tennis coach who led the 1988 and 1992 Olympics teams.

Bettauer, West Berlin-born, was raised in Vancouver and played collegiate tennis for Pan American University, before turning professional in 1978. He made the singles main draw of three Canadian Opens and was a Davis Cup player in 1979, for ties against the Caribbean and Mexico. In 1980 he played in the doubles main draw of the French Open.

See also
List of Canada Davis Cup team representatives

References

External links
 
 
 

1956 births
Living people
Canadian male tennis players
Racket sportspeople from British Columbia
Sportspeople from Vancouver
College men's tennis players in the United States
University of Texas–Pan American alumni
Canadian tennis coaches
Tennis players from Berlin